"Liar" is a song written by Russ Ballard of Argent from their 1970 self-titled debut album. It was released as the band's first single, but did not chart.

A version by Three Dog Night was released the following year and was featured on the band's album, Naturally.  Danny Hutton delivered the lead vocal and Richard Podolor was the producer. In the U.S., "Liar" reached #7 on the Billboard chart. In Canada, the song peaked at #4 in 1971.

Other versions
Capability Brown released a seven-minute rendition of the song on their 1972 Charisma release entitled "From Scratch."
The Meters released both a studio version on their LP "Fire on the Bayou" and a live version of the song on their 1975 album, Uptown Rulers: The Meters live on the Queen Mary.
Graham Bonnet released a version of the song as a single in June 1981 that reached #51 on the UK Singles Chart.  It was featured on his 1981 album, Line-Up.

References

1969 songs
1970 debut singles
1971 singles
1981 singles
Songs written by Russ Ballard
Argent (band) songs
Three Dog Night songs
The Meters songs
Dunhill Records singles
Vertigo Records singles